Lisa Cushley (born 12 April 1969) is a British former pair skater. Competing with her brother, Neil Cushley, she finished 13th at the 1988 Winter Olympics in Calgary. The pair placed 7th at the 1987 European Championships, 14th at the 1988 World championships, and 7th at the 1989 European Championships.

Competitive highlights 
(with Neil Cushley)

References

British female pair skaters
English female pair skaters
1969 births
Olympic figure skaters of Great Britain
Figure skaters at the 1988 Winter Olympics
Living people
Sportspeople from Stockton-on-Tees
Sportspeople from Yorkshire